Frances Cowen (27 December 1915 − 1992) was a British writer of romantic suspense novels and books for children. Her work appeared under the pseudonym Eleanor Hyde as well as her own name. She was also at times known by the names Frances Munthe and Frances Minto-Cowen.

In addition to writing, Cowen worked for Blackwell's in Oxford, England, in 1938−39; was a member of Air Raid Precautions staff in Dartmouth, Devon, during World War II, and was assistant secretary for the Royal Literary Fund in London from 1955 through 1966. Cowen contributed to anthologies, Good Housekeeping, Woman's Weekly, Oxford Times, and other periodicals and newspapers. She was a staff member of Little Folks magazine and a member of PEN International and of the Crime Writers Association.

Personal life
The daughter of Joseph and Helen Cowen, Frances Cowen was born in Oxford, where she was educated at an Ursuline convent and the Milham Ford School for girls. She married George Heinrich Munthe in 1938; he died in 1941. They had one child, a daughter, Mary.

Bibliography

Romantic suspense novels
As Frances Cowen
 The Little Heiress (1961) 
 The Balcony (1962) 
 A Step in the Dark (1962) 
 The Desperate Holiday (1962) 
 The Elusive Quest (1965) 
 The Bitter Reason (1966) 
 Scented Danger (1966) 
 The One Between (1967) 
 The Gentle Obsession (1968) 
 The Fractured Silence (1969) 
 The Daylight Fear (1969) 
 The Shadow of Polperro (1969) 
 Edge of Terror (1970) 
 The Hounds of Carvello (1970) 
 The Nightmare Ends (1970) 
 The Lake of Darkness (1971) 
 The Unforgiving Moment  (1971) 
 The Curse of the Clodaghs (1973) 
 Shadow of Theale (1974) 
 The Village of Fear (1974) 
 The Secret of Weir House (1975) 
 The Dangerous Child (1975) 
 The Haunting of Helen Farley (1976) 
 The Medusa Connection (1976) 
 Sinister Melody (1976) 
 The Silent Pool (1977) 
 The Lost One (1977) 
 Gateway to Nowhere (1978) 
 The House Without a Heart (1978) 
 The House of Larne. (1980) 
 Wait for the Night (1980) 
 The Elusive Lover (1981) 
 Sunrise at Even (1982) 

As Eleanor Hyde
 Tudor Maid (1972) 
 Tudor Masquerade (1972) 
 Tudor Mayhem (1973) 
 Tudor Mystery (1974) 
 Tudor Myth (1976) 
 Tudor Mausoleum (1977) 
 Tudor Murder (1977) 
 Tudor Mansion (1978) 
 Tudor Malice (1979) 
 The Princess Passes (1979)

Books for children
As Frances Cowen
 In the Clutch of the Green Hand (1929) 
 The Wings That Failed (1931) 
 The Milhurst Mystery (1933) 
 The Conspiracy of Silence (1935) 
 The Perilous Adventure (1936) 
 Laddie's Way (1939) 
 The Girl Who Knew Too Much (1940) 
 Mystery Tower (1945) 
 Honor Bound (1946) 
 Castle in Wales (1947) 
 The Secret of Arrivol (1947) 
 Mystery at the Walled House (1951) 
 The Little Countess (1954) 
 The Riddle of the Rocks (1956) 
 Clover Cottage (1958) 
 The Secret of Grange Farm (1961) 
 The Secret of the Loch (1963)

References

1915 births
1992 deaths
20th-century English writers
20th-century British women writers
English crime fiction writers
English mystery writers
Women mystery writers
English romantic fiction writers
writers from Oxford